Selina Solomons (1862–1942) was a California suffragist active in the 1911 campaign which resulted in the passage of Proposition 4. Solomons wrote a first hand account of the movement titled, "How We Won the Vote in California".

Involvement with the California suffrage movement 
Solomons worked with many notable California suffragists including Maud Younger and Lillian Coffin Harris. These women all worked together in September 1911 to form an election committee. This committee would serve as a coalition of a variety of suffrage groups active throughout the state. Women won the vote in California in 1911.

Votes for Women Club 
Solomons believed the 1896 defeat was due in part to a lack of emphasis on organizing working-class women. To address this, she opened the Votes for Women Club near Union Square in San Francisco. By 1910 the club was receiving publicity in local newspapers. It was initially intended to appeal to shop girls and clerks. Reading materials on the suffrage movement were widely available in the club. Under Solomons leadership, in 1910 the Votes for Women Club also aimed to combat the "white slave trade" in girls which was a euphemism in this era for prostitution. It was in 1910 that the Mann Act was passed. In 1912 Solomons attended the California Equal Suffrage Association convention in her role as president of the Votes for Women Club.

Personal life 
Solomons was born in 1862 to a sephardic Jewish family with deep roots in the United States. She was the daughter of Seixas and Hannah Marks Solomons. Despite a humble background her father founded one of the first Jewish temples in the state of California. Selina Solomons died in 1942.

References 

American suffragists
American women's rights activists
California suffrage
1862 births
1942 deaths
History of women in California
Women's rights activists